Live from the Middle East is a live album by The Mighty Mighty Bosstones.  It was released on October 20, 1998 by Mercury Records. This album was recorded live in Cambridge, Massachusetts at The Middle East Restaurant and Nightclub as part of the Bosstones' annual end-of-the-year Hometown Throwdown and is composed of highlights from the five shows the Bosstones played at the Hometown Throwdown that year.  The live version of "The Rascal King" is featured in the PlayStation video game Rogue Trip: Vacation 2012.

Track listing
"1-2-8" – 3:12
"Do Somethin' Crazy" – 2:19
"He's Back" – 3:04
"Devil's Night Out" – 2:41
"Kinder Words" – 2:56
"Noise Brigade" – 2:09
"The Rascal King" – 2:41
"Hell of a Hat" – 3:41
"Holy Smoke" – 3:51
"Hope I Never Lose My Wallet" – 2:00
"I'll Drink to That" – 3:11
"Royal Oil" – 2:33
"Cowboy Coffee" – 2:09
"Doves and Civilians" – 2:32
"Let's Face It" – 2:19
"Howwhywas, Howwhyam" – 2:25
"Dr. D" – 2:51
"Where'd You Go?" – 2:47
"Seven Thirty Seven/Shoe Glue" – 4:16
"The Impression That I Get" – 3:17
"Someday I Suppose" – 3:10
"Lights Out" – 1:13

"Doves and Civilians" is a live version of "Drunks And Children" from their debut album Devil's Night Out

Personnel
Dicky Barrett  – lead vocals, design
Nate Albert  – guitar, backing vocals
Joe Gittleman  – bass, backing vocals
Tim "Johnny Vegas" Burton  – saxophone
Kevin Lenear – saxophone
Dennis Brockenborough  – trombone
Joe Sirois  – drums
Ben Carr – Bosstone, backing vocals
Paul Q. Kolderie  – producer, engineer
Sean Slade  – producer, engineer
Howie Weinberg  – mastering
Brian Dunton – editing
Louis Marino – design
Adam Swinbourne – artwork

1998 live albums
Mercury Records live albums
Albums produced by Paul Q. Kolderie
The Mighty Mighty Bosstones live albums